Viscar is a hamlet in the parish of Wendron, Cornwall, England.

References

Hamlets in Cornwall